Kang Jie (born 31 August 1988) is a Chinese judoka.

She is the bronze medallist of the 2016 Judo Grand Prix Qingdao in the +78 kg category.

References

External links
 

1988 births
Living people
Chinese female judoka
21st-century Chinese women